Mesophleps undulatella is a moth of the family Gelechiidae. It is found in Papua New Guinea.

The wingspan is 13–19.5 mm. The forewings are brown, with an ochreous yellow longitudinal stripe from the base to about the distal fifth.

The larvae feed on Leucaena species. They live in the seed pods.

Etymology
The species name is derived from Latin undulatus (meaning undulated) and the postfix -ellus and
refers to the sinuate caudal margin of the uncus in the male genitalia.

References

Moths described in 2012
Mesophleps